Parts Unknown may refer to:

 Parts Unknown (wrestling)
 Parts Unknown (Crosbie book), a 2006 poetry book by Lynn Crosbie
 Parts Unknown, a 1938 novel by Frances Parkinson Keyes
 "Parts Unknown", a short story by David Francis (author)
 Parts Unknown (game), a board game by Cheapass Games
 Parts Unknown, a 2001 album by Spectre (musician)
 Parts Unknown, an album by The Hydromatics
 Parts Unknown: Hostile Takeover, a 2000 comic book, illustrated by Nat Jones
 Anthony Bourdain: Parts Unknown, an American travel and food television series

See also

 From Parts Unknown (album) 2014 album by Every Time I Die
 Unknown (disambiguation)
 Part (disambiguation)